Elisabeth Hapala (born 1994) is an Austrian chess Woman FIDE Master (WFM, 2015) who won Austrian Women's Chess Championship (2020).

Chess career
In 2020 in Graz Elisabeth Hapala won Austrian Women's Chess Championship.

From 2016 Elisabeth Hapala participates regularly in European Women's Individual Chess Championships.

In Austrian Women's Chess Bundesliga Elisabeth Hapala played for the chess club ASVÖ Pamhagen. She participated with this club in the European Women's Chess Club Cup twice (2013, 2016).

Elisabeth Hapala played for Austria in the Women's Chess Olympiads:
 In 2014, at reserve board in the 41st Chess Olympiad (women) in Tromsø (+3, =1, -3),
 In 2016, at reserve board in the 42nd Chess Olympiad (women) in Baku (+3, =1, -3),
 In 2022, at reserve board in the 44th Chess Olympiad (women) in Chennai (+6, =1, -3).

Elisabeth Hapala played for Austria in the European Women's Team Chess Championship:
 In 2021, at second board in the 14th European Team Chess Championship (women) in Čatež ob Savi (+2, =0, -5).

References

External links 

1994 births
Living people
Chess Woman FIDE Masters
Austrian female chess players